Akhmetovo (Äxmät) is a rural locality (a selo) and the administrative centre of Akhmetovsky Selsoviet, Kushnarenkovsky District, Bashkortostan, Russia. The population was 886 as of 2010. There are 7 streets.

Geography 
Akhmetovo is located 16 km east of Kushnarenkovo (the district's administrative centre) by road. Kanly is the nearest rural locality.

References 

Rural localities in Kushnarenkovsky District